Chadam is an animated web series by artist Alex Pardee based on characters he created for a number of The Used's album artwork and distributed by The WB and Eye Suck Ink. Chadam is produced by Jason "Jace" Hall of HDFILMS Inc. The short series premiered June 15, 2010 on TheWB.com. The WB and its children's network, Kids WB! is closed, but the website is still open. Chadam appeared on the cover of Lies for the Liars. The episodes are nearly 4 to 5 minutes long. iTunes has the episodes in a collection called Chadam, the Complete Series. iTunes episodes are nearly the 13 minute mark because two short episodes are built into one, for example, "Cut from Cardboard" and "Ripley, Believe It or Not" are put together as "The Awakening".

Hall pushed the boundaries of traditional filmmaking by using a computer game engine, Unreal Engine 3, in order to meet the challenge of animating Pardee's surreal work.

List of episodes
Cut from Cardboard
Ripley, Believe It or Not
Repressed Memories
Under Pressure
The Unsung and Undeveloped Hero
Little Orphan Viceroy
Sometimes The Strong Don't Survive
The Grave Escape
No Time to Say Hello, Goodbye
Dying is a Part of Life

References

External links
 Chadam episodes on TheWB.com
 Alex Pardee's official website "Eye Suck Ink "

2010 web series debuts